Cassinia macrochelis is a species of harvestman known from Guinea-Bissau.

References

Harvestmen
Invertebrates of West Africa
Animals described in 1927